Reni Yordanova (born 25 October 1953) is a Bulgarian rower who competed in the 1976 Summer Olympics.

In 1976 she was a crew member of the Bulgarian boat which won the silver medal in the coxed fours event.

External links
 profile

1953 births
Living people
Bulgarian female rowers
Olympic rowers of Bulgaria
Rowers at the 1976 Summer Olympics
Olympic silver medalists for Bulgaria
Olympic medalists in rowing
Medalists at the 1976 Summer Olympics